The Riverland Mallee Important Bird Area  comprises a  tract of mallee habitat and riverine woodland extending from near Waikerie in the Riverland region in eastern South Australia north-eastwards into south-western New South Wales.

Description
The extent of the Important Bird Area (IBA)  in South Australia includes the Riverland Biosphere Reserve, pastoral leases, privately held conservation reserves such the Gluepot Reserve and protected areas declared by statute.  In New South Wales it includes Scotia Sanctuary as well as several areas of uncleared native vegetation.  Wetlands within the extent of the IBA are Lake Merreti, Hart Lagoon and Stockyard Plains.  Threats include inappropriate fire regimes, fox predation, and grazing by feral and domestic herbivores.

Criteria for nomination as an IBA
The site has been identified by BirdLife International as an IBA because it supports the largest population of the critically endangered black-eared miner as well as populations of malleefowl, bush stone-curlews, red-lored whistlers, regent parrots, striated grasswrens, shy heathwrens, southern scrub-robins, hooded robins, chestnut quail-thrushes and purple-gaped honeyeaters.  Ephemeral wetlands support large numbers of sharp-tailed sandpipers and freckled ducks when water conditions are suitable.  Riverine woodlands along the Murray River have high densities of breeding regent parrots.

Associated protected areas in South Australia 
While the IBA has no statutory status in South Australia, it does overlap the following protected areas declared by the South Australian government:
Conservation parks: Cooltong, Danggali, Kapunda Island, Maize Island, Media Island, Morgan, Pike River, Pooginook, Ramco Point, Rilli Island and White Dam.
Game reserves - Chowilla, Loch Luna and Moorook 
Regional reserves - Chowilla
National parks - Murray River
Wilderness protection area: Danggali

See also
 Central NSW Mallee Important Bird Area
 Southern NSW Mallee Important Bird Area
List of birds of South Australia

References

Important Bird Areas of South Australia
Important Bird Areas of New South Wales
Riverland
Mallee Woodlands and Shrublands